Abul Hasnat Muhammad Qamaruzzaman (1926 – 3 November 1975) was a Bangladeshi politician, government minister and a leading member of the Awami League. A member of the Mujibnagar Government, Kamaruzzaman was murdered along with Syed Nazrul Islam, Muhammad Mansur Ali and Tajuddin Ahmed in the jail killings in Dhaka Central Jail on 3 November 1975.

Early life 
Qamaruzzaman was born in 1926 in the city of Bagatipara Upazila, Natore in the province of Bengal (now in Bangladesh). He obtained degrees in economics from the University of Calcutta in 1946, and a law degree from the Rajshahi University in 1956.  He began practising law after his induction in the Rajshahi District bar association.  As a student, Qamaruzzaman became active in the Muslim League and worked for the Pakistan movement.

Political career 
Kamaruzzaman joined the Awami League in 1956. He was elected to the National Assembly of Pakistan in 1962, 1965 and again in 1970. He rose to national party leadership posts in the late 1960s, becoming a close ally of Mujib. During the Bangladesh Liberation War, Kamaruzzaman served as the minister of relief and rehabilitation in the provisional government of Bangladesh formed at Mujibnagar.  After the creation of Bangladesh, he won election to the national parliament from Rajshahi in 1973. He resigned on 18 January 1974, to serve as president of the Awami League.  In 1975, Kamaruzzaman was appointed minister of industries and a member of the executive committee of BAKSAL.

Death and legacy 
After the assassination of Sheikh Mujibur Rahman on 15 August 1975, Qamaruzzaman was arrested by the regime of the new president Khondaker Mostaq Ahmad and imprisoned in the Dhaka Central Jail with Tajuddin Ahmed, Syed Nazrul Islam and Mansur Ali.  These four senior Awami League politicians were killed on 3 November 1975, by army officers who were responsible for Mujib's death. His son, A. H. M. Khairuzzaman Liton, is a Bangladesh Awami League politician and the mayor of Rajshahi City.

References 

1926 births
1975 deaths
People from Rajshahi District
University of Calcutta alumni
Awami League politicians
Presidents of the Awami League
Disaster Management and Relief ministers of Bangladesh
Industries ministers of Bangladesh
Home Affairs ministers of Bangladesh
Bangladesh Liberation War
Bangladeshi people who died in prison custody
Prisoners who died in Bangladeshi detention
Recipients of the Independence Day Award
Pakistani MNAs 1965–1969
Pakistani MNAs 1962–1965
Bangladesh Krishak Sramik Awami League executive committee members
Bangladesh Krishak Sramik Awami League central committee members